Crosswell is an unincorporated community in Putnam County, in the U.S. state of Ohio.

Croswell was not officially platted but served the area as a stop on the railroad. Little remains of the original community.

References

Unincorporated communities in Putnam County, Ohio
Unincorporated communities in Ohio